Women of Genesis is a series of books begun in 2000 by Orson Scott Card.  The books in this series are centered on the wives of the Biblical Patriarchs of the Book of Genesis. To date three books have been published; fourth and fifth books in the series are currently listed as works in progress on Card's website.

Books in the series
 Sarah (2000)
 Rebekah (2001)
 Rachel and Leah (2004)
 The Wives of Israel (forthcoming)
 The Sons of Rachel (forthcoming)

See also

List of works by Orson Scott Card
Bible fiction

External links
 The official Orson Scott Card website

Book series introduced in 2000
Novels by Orson Scott Card
Historical novels by series
Novel series
Hebrew Bible in popular culture